Kalyan Kumar (7 June 1928 – 1 August 1999) was an Indian actor, and an occasional film director and producer who worked primarily in Kannada and Tamil cinema. Making his acting debut in the mythological drama Natashekara (1954), Kalyan Kumar went on to star in over 200 films in a span of over five decades. He was among the much sought after actors in the 1950s through 1970s for lead roles.

Kalyan Kumar has the credit of being the first ever Kannada actor to star in a colour film in Amarashilpi Jakanachari (1963). Alongside Kumar, the 1960s and 1970s in Kannada cinema was dominated by two other actors, Rajkumar and Udayakumar. At a time when actors had a tough time establishing themselves, Kalyan Kumar being successful not only in Kannada cinema, also made a mark in Tamil cinema. Kalyan Kumar along with Udaykumar, Rajkumar were called as "Kumara Thrayaru" (The Kumar Trio) of the Kannada cinema.

Early life
Kalyan Kumar was born as Chokkanna in a Tamil speaking Iyengar family on 7 June 1928 in Bangalore, in the erstwhile Princely State of Mysore of British India. His parents wanted him to be a doctor. But passion for acting brought him to Kannada film land. Born as Chokkanna into a middle-class family, Kalyan Kumar became known for his lavishness and sophistication.

Known for sophisticated portrayal of roles he played the hero against J. Jayalalitha in Maavana Magalu in 1965 and Badukuva Daari in 1966. The triumvirate had acted in Bhoodaana which was a hit in 1962. He had also acted in first full-length colour film in Kannada Amarashilpi Jakanachari, in which he played the role of Jakanachari, a historical figure in sculpture.

Career
Kumar set out to Bombay (now Mumbai) to pursue a career as an actor and approached several film producers to get his first break. Unsuccessful there, he left for Madras (now Chennai) in search for opportunities. He was first cast in the Kannada-language film Natashekhara which released in 1954. He was cast opposite Sandhya and Vidyavathy, the mother and aunt respectively of actress and politician J. Jayalalithaa. He was christened Kalyan Kumar after the name of his mother's character in the film, Kalyaniamma. The film's plot drew a parallel between Kumar's unsuccessful tryst with Hindi cinema and an actor's life who transforms himself to attain fame and glory after the release of his first film.

Kumar would go on to appear in several films depicting social conflict. Bhagya Chakra, Mutthaide Bhagya and Sadarame, all of which released in 1956 fell in this genre. In the latter film, Kumar played a thief. His Bettada Kalla (1957), a remake of the Tamil film Malaikkallan (1954), was a commercial success. Kumar then appeared in social-comedies such as Premada Putri (1957) and Rayara Sose (1957). In Bhookailasa (1958), he played Narada alongside Rajkumar's Ravana. In Manege Banda Mahalakshmi (1959), he appeared alongside his future wife Revathi. In the social-drama Bhoodana (1962), set on the backdrop of Bhoodan movement, he starred alongside Rajkumar and Udaykumar; Kumar played Lachcha, the son of Rajkumar's Dasanna, a Hindu who converts to Christianity in search of a better life. In Thayi Karulu that released the same year, Kumar played dual role of a father and son. While in the remainder of the 1960s, he appeared in films such as Subba Shastry (1966), in which he played a priest; Puttanna Kanagal's Belli Moda (1967), both of which were major commercial successes, he also tried his hand in film production. Endu Ninnavane (1966), Kallu Sakkare (1967) and Pravasi Mandira (1968) all turned out to be commercial failures. Which caused his film career to decline.

He would go on to appear in successful films such as Mavana Mgalu, Arishina Kunkuma, Bedi Bandavalu, Kathaa Sangama, and Kaleju Ranga. In G. V. Iyer's 1962 film, Bhoodaana, Kumar appeared alongside Rajkumar and Udayakumar, the only film that featured the trio together. He acted with all the prominent heroines of his time - B Saroja Devi, Sahukar Janaki, Kalpana, Jayanti, Bharati, Aarathi, and Roopadevi.

He acted in several Kannada-Telugu bi-lingual films made in the 1960s by B Vittalacharya, Nagendra Rao and B R Panthulu. He was a regular actor in the early G V Iyer films like Bhoodana, Tayi karalu, Lawyer magalu and Bangari.

He had very few films to his creadit during 1970s namely College Ranga and katha Sangama , Tulasi to name a few. He bounced back during early 1980s through Successful film Taayiya Nudi and played successful character roles in Simha Gharjane , Shubha Muhurtha, Lakshmi Katakasha, Marali Goodige.

He acted in many Tamil films. His Tamil film Nenjil Oru Alayam was later made in Hindi as Dil Ek Mandir with Rajendra Kumar. As he was gaining popularity in Tamil filmdom, he started acting in more of Tamil movies. But, the regional politics reigned over his acting talents.

He was married to Kannada film heroine Revathi. He also produced and directed stage plays like Ramu Nanna Thamma and Chikamma, many of which were written by his wife. His son Bharath Kalyan is a television actor who acted mainly in Tamil serials. Bharath Kalyan has recently rendered his voice for a character artist in Imaikkaa Nodigal (2018).

Filmography
Please refine and expand this Filmography.

1950s

1960s

1970s

1980s

1990s

References

External links 
 

Indian male film actors
Male actors in Kannada cinema
Male actors in Tamil cinema
1928 births
1999 deaths
20th-century Indian male actors
20th-century Indian film directors
Kannada film directors
Film directors from Bangalore
Male actors from Bangalore
Film producers from Bangalore